Delia Memorial School (Hip Wo No. 2 College) commenced its service in 1984, operating under the management of Delia Group of Schools. It joined the government Direct Subsidy Scheme in September 2000 and became a non-profitable organization located at Kwun Tong, Hong Kong. It is a full-time coeducational grammar school offering S1 – S6 curricula and recommending qualified candidates to sit the Hong Kong Diploma of Secondary Education Examination.

Since 2018
Starting from 1 September 2018, the school's name has been changed from Delia Memorial School (Matteo Ricci) to Delia Memorial School (Hip Wo No.2 College). The new principal and her colleagues bring new initiatives to the school. School promotes "Experiential Learning" and they believe that teaching and learning should not be just confined in classrooms; instead, they advocate experiential learning strategies in the curriculum.

Secondary One Admission
Admission to the school is based on the students' academic result, conduct, extra-curricular activities (ECA) performance, school's remarks and admission interviews. All aspects weigh equally.

Extra-curricular/co-curricular activities
The school encourages students to engage in extra-curricular activities and community services actively and they put great efforts in nurturing their interests in sports, arts and culture. To cope with the development of the OLE, the school has organized more than 30 school clubs and interest classes of different respects, including academic and non-academic areas, of which the students are free to choose from. Besides, whole school functions such as "Life wide learning exhibition", "Talent Show", "Sports day" and "Swimming Gala" are organized annually for the holistic development of students.

List of notable alumni
John Woo (吳宇森), film director, writer, and producer.

See also
 Education in Hong Kong
 List of secondary schools in Hong Kong

References

External links

 Official Website

Educational institutions established in 1984
Direct Subsidy Scheme schools
Secondary schools in Hong Kong
Delia Group of Schools
Kwun Tong
1984 establishments in Hong Kong